Uncertain may refer to:

 Uncertain, Texas, a town in the United States
 Uncertain (album), 1991 album of The Cranberries
 Uncertain, a music project of Florian-Ayala Fauna
 Hoplodrina octogenaria, a moth of Europe and Asia

See also 
 Uncertainty – not able to be relied on or lack of confidence